Murtoa is a wheat district town in Victoria, Australia, situated around Lake Marma on the Wimmera Highway,  north-west of the state capital, Melbourne. The town is in the Shire of Yarriambiack local government area.

The name Murtoa is believed to come from a local Aboriginal word meaning "home of the lizard". Murtoa's post office opened on 1 August 1874.
Many of Murtoa's pioneer farmers were German immigrants, attracted from South Australia by Victorian government incentives.

The working section of the present-day Murtoa Grain Receival Centre can hold up to 400,000 tonnes of grain and is the largest inland Receival Centre in Australia.

Lake Marma
Murtoa's Lake Marma, situated in the center of town, has always been a haven for wildlife and one of the most attractive lakes in the Wimmera. It is currently being improved with restored surrounds. The main feature is the impressive 1890s avenues of sugar gum trees around most of the lake. There is a playground, BBQs, Rotunda and large lawned areas adjacent.
Rabl park immediately to the North of Lake Marma is a series of waterways and ponds with attractive treed surrounds. It also incorporates a Skate Park, playground, 1896 Railway's walking bridge, BBQ and large grassed areas.
Both Lakes are great fishing and recreational areas, with abundant birdlife and pleasant formed walking tracks surrounding both.

The Lake Marma precinct also includes a quality swimming pool, well shaded both naturally and by shade.

The Murtoa Stick Shed
Murtoa is the site of the largest rustically-built structure in the world, the Murtoa No. 1 Grain Store, known locally as the "Stick Shed". Because wheat could not be exported during the Second World War, a "temporary" grain shed, 270m long and 60m wide, was built in late 1941 and early 1942, using 560 un-milled mountain tree trunks. These "sticks", braced with iron tie rods, are set in a concrete floor and support a hipped corrugated iron roof. The impressive cathedral-like structure was last used to hold wheat in 1989–90.

The Murtoa Stick Shed was heritage listed in 1990, and in October 2008 the Victorian government allocated funds to restore the structure. The Murtoa Stick Shed has become a significant tourist attraction and is open Tuesday to Saturday from 10 to 12.30, and from 10 until 2pm Sunday. Allow plenty of time to enjoy this unique building.

The Murtoa No. 1 Grain Store was added to the Australian National Heritage List in October 2014.

Shopping
Murtoa's main shopping centre is located in McDonald St. and is a largely original c1910 precinct, with timber facades and verandah posts. It features a large Thrifty Link hardware store, IGA supermarket, licensed Post Office, fuel outlet and service station, cafe/coffee shop, Neighbourhood House, Op Shop, furniture restorer, firearms supplies, upholsterer and a few smaller mixed businesses, including a newsagency. A large new Medical Centre at the Wimmera Highway (Marma St) intersection is a major feature of the town, with many services offered and Chemist's outlet included. There is also a CBA Bank in Marma St with ATM. Marma St also has a 'card-only' self-serve fuel outlet, while Duncan St includes a butcher's shop and a comprehensive delicatessen with hot or cold 'take-away' food. The restored 1928 large Mechanics Hall is adjacent.

Murtoa also has some larger local employers, which includes GrainCorp, Schier Cabinet Makers and Solomit Strawboard.

Schools
Murtoa has two schools, Our Lady Help of Christians {OLHC}, a Catholic primary school in Munro Street, and Murtoa College, a P-12 state school in Webb Street. There is also a kindergarten.

Sport
The town has both Australian Rules football and Netball teams competing in the Wimmera Football League.

The Warracknabeal-Wimmera Racing Club, in conjunction with the local Murtoa/Marma Racing Club, schedules two race meetings a year at Murtoa, including the Murtoa Cup meeting in October and the Marma Cup on New Year's Day. From 2016, the Marma Cup will no longer be run on New Year's Day as this event was canceled in conjunction with the local club and Racing Victoria. In lieu of this decision, Murtoa will host a mid-week race meeting in July 2016. These two meetings are very popular with all Wimmera residents.

Golfers play at the 18 hole sand-scrape Golf Course of the Murtoa Golf Club on Murtoa-Lubeck Road, just South of town. There are also excellent bowling greens, new tennis courts, quality sports ground with new clubrooms and netball court. 
There is an indoor stadium located at the college.

Notable people
John Cade - psychiatrist was born in Murtoa in 1912.

Amalie Sara Colquhoun, an Australian landscape and portrait painter, was born in Murtoa.
Chris Crewther, former Federal Member for Dunkley and Chair of the Foreign Affairs and Aid Sub-Committee in the Australian Parliament, schooled at Murtoa (Secondary) College between 1996 and 1999.
Hugh Delahunty, Member of the Victorian Legislative Assembly from 1999 to 2014, representing Wimmera and Lowan, was born and schooled in Murtoa.

References

External links

Hudson at Murtoa – a family history
Murtoa at Yarriambiack Shire website

Towns in Victoria (Australia)
Wimmera